The year 2011 is the eighth year in the history of the Konfrontacja Sztuk Walki, a mixed martial arts promotion based in Poland. In 2011 Konfrontacja Sztuk Walki held 4 events beginning with, KSW Extra 2.

List of events

KSW Extra 2

KSW Extra 2 was a mixed martial arts event held on January 29, 2011 at the Hala MOSiR in Elk, Poland.

Results

KSW 15: Khalidov vs. Irvin

KSW 15: Khalidov vs. Irvin was a mixed martial arts event held on March 19, 2011 at the Hala Torwar in Warsaw, Poland.

Results

KSW 16: Khalidov vs. Lindland

KSW 16: Khalidov vs. Lindland was a mixed martial arts event held on May 21, 2011 at the Ergo Arena in Gdańsk, Poland.

Results

KSW 17: Revenge

KSW 17: Revenge was a mixed martial arts event held on April 1, 2011 at the Atlas Arena in Lódz, Poland.

Results

References

Konfrontacja Sztuk Walki events
2011 in mixed martial arts